Osman Coşgül (1 July 1928 – 8 October 2001) was a Turkish long-distance runner who competed in the 1952 Summer Olympics.

References

1928 births
2001 deaths
Turkish male long-distance runners
Olympic athletes of Turkey
Athletes (track and field) at the 1952 Summer Olympics
Mediterranean Games silver medalists for Turkey
Mediterranean Games medalists in athletics
Athletes (track and field) at the 1955 Mediterranean Games
20th-century Turkish people
21st-century Turkish people